William Franklin Hart (July 19, 1865 – September 19, 1936) was a professional baseball player who played pitcher in the Major Leagues from 1886 to 1901. Hart pitched in the American Association, National League and American League.

External links

1865 births
1936 deaths
Major League Baseball pitchers
Baseball players from Louisville, Kentucky
19th-century baseball players
Philadelphia Athletics (AA) players
Brooklyn Grooms players
Pittsburgh Pirates players
St. Louis Browns (NL) players
Cleveland Blues (1901) players
Chattanooga Lookouts players
Lincoln Tree Planters players
Buffalo Bisons (minor league) players
Des Moines Prohibitionists players
Lincoln Rustlers players
Sioux City Corn Huskers players
Minneapolis Millers (baseball) players
Milwaukee Brewers (minor league) players
Milwaukee Creams players
Cleveland Lake Shores players
Peoria Distillers players
Columbus Senators players
Indianapolis Indians players
Little Rock Travelers players
Minor league baseball managers
Memphis Reds players